Rory Lobb (born 9 February 1993) is a professional Australian rules footballer playing for the Western Bulldogs in the Australian Football League (AFL), having previously played for  and .

Early life
Lobb who came to football late after mainly focusing on basketball was taken with pick 29 in the 2013 national draft, and stands at 206 cm. Despite his height, he impressed many with his athletic ability while playing with Swan Districts in the West Australian Football League (WAFL) in 2013 where he averaged twelve disposals, three marks and twenty-four hitouts.

AFL career
In round 12, 2014, Lobb was selected by the Giants to make his debut against  at Spotless Stadium. Starting on Essendon veteran Dustin Fletcher, he joined the select few who kicked his first AFL goal with his first kick. In 2018, with the retirement of Shane Mumford straining GWS ruck options, Lobb was primarily used as the #1 ruckman. One of his standout games in the 2018 season came in round 15 against Hawthorn, where he kicked 3 goals in the first quarter. 

On the first day of the 2018 trade period, Lobb formally requested a trade to the Fremantle Dockers. He had previously met with both WA-based clubs to explore his options, with permission from GWS, despite being contracted for 2019. He was officially traded on 17 October to Fremantle.

In 2019, after playing in both pre-season matches, Lobb made his debut for Fremantle in Round 1 against North Melbourne and kicked 2 goals. He went on to play 15 games in his first year at the Dockers, with foot and shoulder injuries affecting him. 

Lobb's contested marking ability has been a strong aspect of his game, and in 2020 he collected 37 contested marks (an average of 2.2 per game) which ranked him third overall in the league.

Lobb kicked a career best five goal haul during Fremantle's eight point win over Port Adelaide during round sixteen of the 2022 AFL season.

Statistics
Statistics are correct to the end of round 10, 2022

|- style="background-color: #EAEAEA"
! scope="row" style="text-align:center" | 2014
|
| 37 || 2 || 1 || 0 || 6 || 7 || 13 || 5 || 5 || 3 || 0.5 || 0.0 || 3.0 || 3.5 || 6.5 || 2.5 || 2.5 || 1.5 || 0
|- 
! scope="row" style="text-align:center" | 2015
|
| 37 || 9 || 6 || 3 || 39 || 36 || 75 || 29 || 29 || 80 || 0.7 || 0.3 || 4.3 || 4.0 || 8.3 || 3.2 || 3.2 || 8.9 || 0
|- style="background-color: #EAEAEA"
! scope="row" style="text-align:center" | 2016
|
| 37 || 24 || 29 || 16 || 170 || 114 || 284 || 111 || 65 || 158 || 1.2 || 0.7 || 7.1 || 4.8 || 11.8 || 4.6 || 2.7 || 6.6 || 5
|- 
! scope="row" style="text-align:center" | 2017
|
| 37 || 20 || 17 || 8 || 123 || 105 || 228 || 86 || 47 || 221 || 0.9 || 0.4 || 6.2 || 5.3 || 11.4 || 4.3 || 2.4 || 11.1 || 0
|- style="background-color: #EAEAEA"
! scope="row" style="text-align:center" | 2018
|
| 37 || 19 || 11 || 10 || 127 || 55 || 182 || 60 || 54 || 394 || 0.6 || 0.5 || 6.7 || 2.9 || 9.6 || 3.2 || 2.8 || 20.7 || 0
|- 
! scope="row" style="text-align:center" | 2019
|
| 37 || 15 || 13 || 11 || 119 || 78 || 197 || 61 || 24 || 319 || 0.9 || 0.7 || 7.9 || 5.2 || 13.1 || 4.1 || 1.6 || 21.3 || 1
|- style="background-color: #EAEAEA"
! scope="row" style="text-align:center" | 2020
|
| 37 || 17 || 10 || 6 || 116 || 57 || 173 || 63 || 24 || 156 || 0.6 || 0.4 || 6.8 || 3.4 || 10.2 || 3.7 || 1.4 || 9.2 || 3
|- 
! scope="row" style="text-align:center" | 2021
|
| 37 || 13 || 20 || 19 || 108 || 60 || 168 || 73 || 15 || 54 || 1.5 || 1.5 || 8.3 || 4.6 || 12.9 || 5.6 || 1.2 || 4.2 || 7
|- style="background-color: #EAEAEA"
! scope="row" style="text-align:center" | 2022
|
| 37 || 9 || 14 || 8 || 52 || 49 || 101 || 31 || 14 || 88 || 1.6 || 0.9 || 5.8 || 5.4 || 11.2 || 3.4 || 1.6 || 9.8 || TBA
|- class="sortbottom"
! colspan=3| Career
! 128
! 121
! 81
! 860
! 561
! 1421
! 519
! 277
! 1473
! 0.9
! 0.6
! 6.7
! 4.4
! 11.1
! 4.1
! 2.2
! 11.5
! 16
|}

Notes

References

External links

1995 births
Living people
Swan Districts Football Club players
Australian rules footballers from Western Australia
Greater Western Sydney Giants players
Fremantle Football Club players